The DIN 1.0/2.3 connector is a RF connector used for coaxial cable at microwave frequencies. They were introduced in the 1990s for telecommunication applications. They are available in 50 Ω and 75 Ω impedance and are compatible with the most widely used cable sizes. It has a push/pull lock and release feature. The DIN 1.0/2.3 is ideally suited to applications where space limitation is a factor. In broadcasting applications the 75 Ω version is used for Serial Digital Interface video data up to maximum frequency of 4 GHz.  The 50 Ω connector can be used to a maximum of 10 GHz.

Not to be confused with
 DIN connector
 7/16 DIN connector
 Mini-DIN connector

Use of 75 ohm version 
 Serial digital interface
 CoaXPress
 AES3

See also
BNC connector
Coaxial cable
RF connector

References

RF connectors